The Meia Ponte Microregion is a statistical region of Goiás state, Brazil created by the IBGE (Instituto Brasileiro de Geografia e Estatística).  It is located south of the state capital, Goiânia, and includes 21 municipalities with a total population of 338,147 inhabitants (2007).  The total area is 21,229.00 km2.  The region takes in the Meia Ponte River basin.  The largest cities are Morrinhos, Goiatuba, Itumbiara, and Caldas Novas. The region has great variety in landscape.  The north is hillier while the south is characterized by rolling plains with herds of beef cattle and plantations of corn and soybeans.

Municipalities 
The microregion consists of the following municipalities:

See also
List of municipalities in Goiás
Microregions of Goiás

References

Microregions of Goiás